Mukta Kumari Yadav  is a Nepali politician belonging to Nepali Congress who also serves as a Member of Pratinidhi Sabha, lower house of the Federal Parliament of Nepal. She is also a former member of Rastriya Sabha and was elected under women's category.

She was elected central committee member of Nepali Congress with highest vote from the 14th general convention of Nepali Congress.

References 

People from Dhanusha District
Nepali Congress politicians from Madhesh Province
Living people
Year of birth missing (living people)
Members of the 2nd Nepalese Constituent Assembly
Members of the National Assembly (Nepal)
Nepal MPs 2022–present